Ben Cunnington  (born 30 June 1991) is an Australian rules footballer who plays for the North Melbourne Football Club in the Australian Football League (AFL). Cunnington was drafted to North Melbourne with the 5th selection in the 2009 AFL draft.

Cunnington plays predominantly as an inside midfielder, and he can play in the forward line to accommodate the midfield rotations.

Junior career

Cunnington made his senior debut for Cobden at the age of 15. In his first game against Camperdown he kicked ten goals after coming on the ground just before half time. Cunnington's other junior football highlights included earning NAB AFL U18 Championships All-Australian honours and finishing runner up in the TAC Cup Morrish Medal where he averaged 23 disposals (11 contested) and six marks. Cunnington missed the 2009 AFL Draft Camp through minor injuries.

Geelong Falcons regional manager Michael Turner described Cunnington as the most professional player I have seen in 15 years of TAC Cup.

AFL career
Cunnington was drafted by North Melbourne with the 5th overall selection of the 2009 AFL draft from the Geelong Falcons.

He made his debut in Tasmania against Hawthorn in Round 5 of the 2010 season where he gathered 12 disposals helping North Melbourne to a 12-point win and their second victory of the season.

Often considered one of the toughest players in the AFL, Cunnington won North’s best and fairest award, the Syd Barker Medal in 2014 and 2019 and was runner up in 2015, 2017, 2018 and 2021. He was also an All-Australian nominee in 2019. As of the end of 2022, Cunnington has tallied a career total of 71 Brownlow Medal votes.

In August 2022, Cunnington signed a two-year contract extension at North, taking him to the end of the 2024 season.

Personal life
Cunnington founded the Shinboner Cattle Company in 2016.

He grew up on a dairy farm in regional Victoria and is a keen farmer and fisherman.

Cunnington has twice recovered from cancer to earn his place again in North Melbourne’s top side.

He is married with three children.

References

External links

1991 births
Living people
North Melbourne Football Club players
Australian rules footballers from Victoria (Australia)
Geelong Falcons players
Cobden Football Club players
Syd Barker Medal winners
North Ballarat Football Club players